Gediminas' Tower is the remaining  part of the Upper Castle in Vilnius, Lithuania.

The first wooden fortifications were built by Gediminas, Grand Duke of Lithuania. The first brick castle was completed in 1409 by Grand Duke Vytautas. The three-floor tower was rebuilt in 1933 by Polish architect Jan Borowski. Some remnants of the old castle have been restored, guided by archaeological research.

The hilltop can be reached on foot or by lift. The tower houses a museum exhibiting archaeological findings from the hill and the surrounding areas. This building is 3 stories tall and is made of decades old bricks. The museum has models of Vilnius castles from the 14th to the 17th centuries, armament, and iconographic material of the Old Vilnius.

Gediminas' Tower is an important state and historic symbol of the city of Vilnius and of Lithuania itself. It was depicted on  the former national currency, the litas, and is mentioned in numerous Lithuanian patriotic poems and folk songs. The flag of Lithuania was re-hoisted atop the tower on October 7, 1988, during the independence movement that was finalized by the Act of the Re-Establishment of the State of Lithuania on March 11, 1990.

A reconstruction of the Royal Palace of Lithuania was completed in 2009, and is located near the base of the hill upon which Gediminas' Tower stands.

Legend

 

Long ago, the Lithuanian Grand Duke Gediminas was hunting in the woods of Šventaragis Valley. The hunt was successful, and Duke Gediminas brought down a wild bull on a hilltop; but he grew weary in his limbs, and so the duke retired and spent the night there. Now Gediminas had a dream that, up on top of the same hill where he had been hunting that day, stood a great wolf made of iron, and it was howling as loudly as if it were a hundred wolves.

The Duke asked the court magician Lizdeika to explain his dream to him. He interpreted it thus: this was an omen indicating that he should build a city in this place, which would later become known around the world and would become the magnificent capital city of Lithuania.

Gediminas, obeying the will of the gods, began to build the future capital city, and a castle in the centre of it. The city was named Vilnius after the nearby river Vilnia. Gediminas' Tower is the only surviving part of that castle built by Gediminas.

See also
 Three Crosses
 Pilies Street
 Cathedral Square, Vilnius
 Gothic architecture in Lithuania
 Gediminas' Cap

References

External links
 Visit the exposition of Gediminas tower
 Photo history of the tower

Buildings and structures completed in 1409
Towers completed in the 15th century
Castles in Lithuania
Landmarks in Vilnius
National symbols of Lithuania
Towers in Lithuania
Brick Gothic
Gothic architecture in Lithuania
Tourist attractions in Vilnius
Castles of the Grand Duchy of Lithuania